The Alisport Yuma is an Italian ultralight aircraft, produced by Alisport of Cremella. The aircraft is supplied as a kit for amateur construction or as a complete ready-to-fly-aircraft.

Zenith Aircraft considers the Yuma an unauthorized copy of the Zenith STOL CH 701. The World Directory of Light Aviation describes it as being inspired by the CH 701.

Design and development
The aircraft was designed to comply with the Fédération Aéronautique Internationale microlight rules. It features STOL performance, a strut-braced high-wing, a two-seats-in-side-by-side configuration enclosed cockpit, fixed tricycle landing gear and a single engine in tractor configuration.

The Yuma's fuselage is made from welded steel tubing, covered in aluminium sheet and the tail surfaces covered in doped aircraft fabric. The wing is all-aluminium, with its leading edge slats made from carbon fibre. Its  span wing employs V-struts, jury struts and flaps. Standard engines available are the  Rotax 912UL, the  Rotax 912ULS and the  Rotax 914 turbo-charged four-stroke powerplant.

Specifications (Yuma)

References

External links

1990s Italian ultralight aircraft
Homebuilt aircraft
Single-engined tractor aircraft
Alisport aircraft